This is a list of notable people whose names or pseudonyms are customarily written with one or more lower case initial letters.

This list currently includes:
 names starting with "ff", which is a stylised version of an upper-case F.
 one name with "de" followed by an upper case letter, which is standard practice for tussenvoegsels. There are large numbers of Dutch people with names constructed similarly.

References

Lower case